This is a timeline documenting the events of heavy metal in the year 1975.

Newly formed bands 

 Angel
The Babys
Boston 
Crack the Sky
Goddo
Ian Gillan Band 
Iris  
 Iron Maiden
 Jameson Raid
 Legs Diamond
 Lone Star
 Motörhead
 Ted Nugent
Paris
 Rainbow
 Riot
 The Runaways
 Starz
 Triumph
 White Spirit
 White Wolf
Zebra

Albums

February

March

April

June

July

August

September

October

November

December

Unknown 
Moxy - Moxy

The Rocky Horror Picture Show

Events 
 Motörhead's original drummer, Lucas Fox, leaves the band. He is replaced by Phil "Philthy Animal" Taylor.
Gary Thain, bassist for Uriah Heep, dies from a heroin overdose on 8 December.

References

1970s in heavy metal music
Metal